The cot–caught merger or  merger, formally known in linguistics as the low back merger, is a sound change present in some dialects of English where speakers do not distinguish the vowel phonemes in "cot" and "caught". "Cot" and "caught" (along with "bot" and "bought", "pond" and "pawned", etc.) is an example of a minimal pair that is lost as a result of this sound change. The merger is typical of most Canadian and Scottish English dialects as well as some Irish and U.S. English dialects.

An additional vowel merger, the father–bother merger, which spread through North America in the eighteenth and nineteenth centuries, has resulted today in a three-way merger in which most Canadian and many U.S. accents have no vowel difference in words like "palm" , "lot" , and "thought" . However,  as in "North" is generally not merged.

Overview

The shift causes the vowel sound in words like cot, nod and stock and the vowel sound in words like caught, gnawed and stalk to merge into a single phoneme; therefore the pairs cot and caught, stock and stalk, nod and gnawed become perfect homophones, and shock and talk, for example, become perfect rhymes. The cot–caught merger is completed in the following dialects:
 
Some English of the British Isles, outside of England:
Most Scottish English, towards 
Broad and traditional Irish English
Some northern Ulster English including in conservative mid Ulster English towards  and in Ulster Scots English towards 
Much of the English of North America: 
Certain varieties of American English, including:
Pittsburgh English, towards  (with the father–bother merger) 
Much of New England English towards  (in Boston, particularly towards ), and Northern New England generally, however traditionally not Southern New England
Western American English (with the father–bother merger) towards 
 Cajun English, Upper Midwestern English, and Chicano English (with the father–bother merger) towards 
Nearly all Canadian English, including:
Standard Canadian English towards  (with the father–bother merger)
Maritimer and Newfoundland English, towards  (with the father–bother merger)
Much Indian English towards  or 
Some Singaporean English

North American English

Nowhere is the shift more complex than in North American English. The presence of the merger and its absence are both found in many different regions of the North American continent, where it has been studied in greatest depth, and in both urban and rural environments.

Even without taking into account the mobility of the American population, the distribution of the merger is still complex; there are pockets of speakers with the merger in areas that lack it, and vice versa.  There are areas where the merger has only partially occurred, or is in a state of transition.  For example, based on research directed by William Labov (using telephone surveys) in the 1990s, younger speakers in Kansas, Nebraska, and the Dakotas exhibited the merger while speakers older than 40 typically did not.  The 2003 Harvard Dialect Survey, in which subjects did not necessarily grow up in the place they identified as the source of their dialect features, indicates that there are speakers of both merging and contrast-preserving accents throughout the country, though the basic isoglosses are almost identical to those revealed by Labov's 1996 telephone survey. Both surveys indicate that, as of the 1990s, approximately 60% of American English speakers preserved the contrast, while approximately 40% merged the phonemes. Further complicating matters are speakers who merge the phonemes in some contexts but not others, or merge them when the words are spoken unstressed or casually but not when they're stressed.

Speakers with the merger in northeastern New England still maintain a phonemic distinction between a fronted and unrounded  (phonetically ) and a back and usually rounded  (phonetically ), because in northeastern New England (unlike in Canada and the Western United States), the cot–caught merger occurred without the father–bother merger.

Labov et al. also reveal that, for about 15% of respondents, a specific – merger before  but not before  (or other consonants) is in effect, so that Don and dawn are homophonous, but cot and caught are not. In this case, a distinct vowel shift (which overlaps with the cot–caught merger for all speakers who have indeed completed the cot–caught merger) is taking place, identified as the Don–dawn merger.

Resistance
According to Labov, Ash, and Boberg, the merger in North America is most strongly resisted in three regions:
The "South", somewhat excluding Texas and Florida.
The "Inland North", encompassing the eastern and central Great Lakes region (on the U.S. side of the border)
The "Northeast Corridor" along the Atlantic coast, ranging from Baltimore to Philadelphia to New York City to Providence. However, the merger is common in Boston and further northern New England.

In the three American regions above, sociolinguists have studied three phonetic shifts that can explain their resistance to the merger. The first is the fronting of  found in the Inland North; speakers advance the  vowel  as far as the cardinal  (the open front unrounded vowel), thus allowing the  vowel  to lower into the phonetic environment of  without any merger taking place. None of these three phonetic shifts, however, is certain to preserve the contrast for all speakers in these regions. Some speakers in all three regions, particularly younger ones, are beginning to exhibit the merger despite the fact that each region's phonetics should theoretically block it.

African American Vernacular English accents have traditionally resisted the cot–caught merger, with   pronounced  and  traditionally pronounced , though now often . This chain shift is called the "African American Shift". However, there is still evidence of AAVE speakers picking up the cot–caught merger in Pittsburgh, Pennsylvania, in Charleston, South Carolina, Florida and Georgia, and in parts of California.

Origin
In North America, the first evidence of the merger (or its initial conditions) comes from western Pennsylvania as far back as the data show. From there, it entered Upper Canada (what is now Ontario). In the mid-19th century, the merger also independently began in eastern New England, possibly influencing the Canadian Maritimes, though the merger is in evidence as early as the 1830s in both regions of Canada: Ontario and the Maritimes. Fifty years later, the merger "was already more established in Canada" than in its two U.S. places of origin. In Canadian English, further westward spread was completed more quickly than in English of the United States.

Two traditional theories of the merger's origins have been longstanding in linguistics: one group of scholars argues for an independent North American development, while others argue for contact-induced language change via Scots-Irish or Scottish immigrants to North America. In fact, both theories may be true but for different regions. The merger's appearance in western Pennsylvania is better explained as an effect of Scots-Irish settlement,<ref>Evanini, Keelan (2009). "The permeability of dialect boundaries: A case study of the region surrounding Erie, Pennsylvania". University of Pennsylvania; dissertations available from ProQuest. AAI3405374. pp. 254-255.</ref> but in eastern New England, and perhaps the American West, as an internal structural development. Canadian linguist Charles Boberg considers the issue unresolved. A third theory has been used to explain the merger's appearance specifically in northeastern Pennsylvania: an influx of Polish- and other Slavic-language speakers whose learner English failed to maintain the distinction.

England
In London's Cockney accent, a cot–caught merger is possible only in rapid speech. The  vowel has two phonemically distinct variants: closer  (phonetically ) and more open  (phonetically ).

Scotland

Outside North America, another dialect featuring the merger is Scottish English. Like in New England English, the cot–caught merger occurred without the father–bother merger.

See also
 Phonological history of English open back vowels

Notes

References

Bibliography

External links
 Map of the cot–caught merger from the 2003 Harvard Dialect Survey
 Map of the cot–caught merger from Labov's 1996 telephone survey
 Description of the cot–caught merger in the Phonological Atlas
 Map of the cot–caught merger before  and 
 Chapter 13 of the Atlas of North American English, which discusses the "short-o" configuration of various American accents

Dialects of English
Splits and mergers in English phonology